The Nova Scotia Liberal Party (officially the Liberal Association of Nova Scotia) is a centrist provincial political party in Nova Scotia, Canada and the provincial section of the Liberal Party of Canada. The party currently forms the Official Opposition in Nova Scotia, under the leadership of Zach Churchill. The party was in power most recently from the 2013 election until the 2021 election.

Origins
The party is descended from the pre-Confederation Reformers in Nova Scotia who coalesced around Joseph Howe demanding the institution of responsible government. The Liberals (Reformers) formed several governments in the colony between 1848 and 1867.

The party split during the debate on Confederation, with Howe and most other Liberals forming an Anti-Confederation Party, while supporters of confederation joined Tory Charles Tupper's Confederation Party. Howe, himself, initially opposed Confederation, but accepted it as a reality after initial attempts to scuttle it failed.

In 1868, Howe joined the pro-Confederation forces, serving for a time in the federal Cabinet of Sir John A. Macdonald.

The Anti-Confederation Party took most of Nova Scotia's seats in the House of Commons of Canada in 1867, as well as forming the government of the new province under William Annand. The new, post-1867 Liberal Party was organised by Annand and his anti-Confederate forces, while the Conservative Party was organised by Tupper and supporters of Sir John A. Macdonald's coalition in the province.

Prior to 1956, the Nova Scotia Liberal Party had ruled the province for 76 of its 89 years, most of that time with fewer than five opposition members. It had also ruled prior to confederation, and was responsible for bringing the first responsible government to North America.  From 1882 to 1925, the Liberals held power for an unbroken 43 years, the second longest serving political dynasty in Canadian history, behind the Alberta PCs.

The party in recent years
From 1956 the Tories gained significant ground with Robert Stanfield's reformation of the "Progressive Conservatives", and have successfully challenged the Liberals for control of the government. The Liberals faltered in the province at the beginning of the 21st century, and for a time were the third-largest party in the House of Assembly, behind the Tories and the Nova Scotia New Democratic Party. After the Nova Scotia Liberal Party's dismal performance in the 2006 election (and failing to win his own seat), leader Francis MacKenzie announced his resignation. He was succeeded by Stephen McNeil.  In the 2009 election, the Liberals moved out of third-party status and formed the official opposition once again.  In the 2013 election, the Liberals won a majority government, their first since the 1993 election under John Savage, and took office for the first time in 14 years. Under McNeil, a self-described fiscal conservative, the party pushed for balanced provincial budgets and took a firm stance against public sector unions.

The Nova Scotia Liberals are the provincial section of the federal Liberal Party of Canada. The two parties have a shared membership, and Liberal Members of Parliament often become Liberal Members of the Legislative Assembly, and vice versa. Gerald Regan, for instance, became leader of the provincial party after serving as a Liberal MP. He joined the federal Liberal government after serving as premier of Nova Scotia. Angus L. Macdonald, the province's most storied Liberal premier, split his term into two by spending five years as a federal Liberal cabinet minister in the wartime government of William Lyon Mackenzie King.

In the 2009 election, Stephen McNeil led the Liberals to Official Opposition status, winning 11 seats.

In the 2013 election, the McNeil Liberals won a majority government, defeating the NDP government of Darrell Dexter.

In the 2017 election, the McNeil Liberals retained a reduced majority of 27 seats in the legislature.

On August 6, 2020, McNeil announced he will step down as party leader and that he will continue to act as premier and as the party's leader until the a replacement is found. On February 23, 2021, Rankin became the 29th Premier of Nova Scotia, replacing McNeil. Rankin called a snap election for August 17, 2021, which his Liberal Party lost. Rankin was personally re-elected in Timberlea-Prospect.

Current elected member

Party leaders
 James B. Uniacke (1840–1854)
 William Young (1854–1860)
 Joseph Howe (1860–1864)
 Adams G. Archibald (1864–1867)
 William Annand (1867–1875)
 Philip Carteret Hill (1875–1878)
 William F. McCurdy (1878–1882) (house leader)
 William Thomas Pipes (1882–1884)
 William Stevens Fielding (1884–1896)
 George Henry Murray (1896–1923)
 Ernest Howard Armstrong (1923–1925)
 William Chisholm (1925–1930)
 Angus L. Macdonald (1930–1940)
 A.S. MacMillan (1940–1945)
 Angus L. Macdonald (1945–1954)
 Harold Connolly (1954) (interim)
 Henry Hicks (1954–1961)
 Earl W. Urquhart (1961–1965) (house leader 1961–1962)
 Gerald Regan (1965–1980)
 Benoit Comeau (1980) (interim)
 Sandy Cameron (1980–1985)
 Vince MacLean (1985)
 Bill Gillis (1985–1986) (interim)
 Vince MacLean (1986–1992)
 John Savage (1992–1997)
 Russell MacLellan (1997–2000)
 Wayne Gaudet (2000–2002) (interim)
 Danny Graham (2002–2004)
 Wayne Gaudet (2004) (interim)
 Francis MacKenzie (2004–2006)
 Michel Samson (2006–2007) (interim)
 Stephen McNeil (2007–2021)
 Iain Rankin (2021–2022)
 Zach Churchill (2022-Present)

Election results

See also

 List of Nova Scotia political parties
 List of Nova Scotia premiers
 2021 Nova Scotia Liberal Party leadership election
 Nova Scotia Liberal Party leadership elections

References

External links
Liberal Party of Nova Scotia

Liberal Party of Canada
Provincial political parties in Nova Scotia
Liberal parties in Canada
Centrist parties in Canada